Hollie Thomson (born 25 December 1986) is a Scottish former football midfielder who played for Scottish Women's Premier League (SWPL) clubs Hamilton Academical, Hibernian, Rangers and Motherwell. She has represented the Scotland women's national football team at youth and senior level.

Early life
Thomson's father Bobby was also a footballer. She was born and grew up in England, where Bobby had played for Blackpool.

Club career
In 2008 Thomson emulated her father Bobby by signing for Hibernian: "I always strive to get better and when Hibs asked me to join I didn't think twice about it. Hibernian is a big and very successful club and I wanted to be part of that." In 2013 she transferred to Rangers, after falling into dispute with the manager of Hibernian. She signed for Motherwell in January 2020, following an injury-related break from football.

International career
In September 2003, while attached to East Durham College, Thomson was named in the Scotland women's national under-19 football team by coach Tony Gervaise. As a Civil Service Strollers player she scored twice in a 4–1 win over Israel in May 2005, which qualified Scotland for the UEFA Women's Under-19 Championship finals for the first time. In the final tournament Thomson scored an own goal against France as Scotland made a first round exit.

According to the Scottish Football Association (SFA), Thomson made her senior Scotland debut in a 1–0 friendly defeat by Finland at Veritas Stadion, Turku in September 2007. Other sources indicate she featured as a 72nd-minute substitute for Pauline Hamill in a 4–0 2007 FIFA Women's World Cup qualification (UEFA) defeat by Russia at McDiarmid Park on 24 May 2006. She scored her first and only senior goal for Scotland at the 2008 Cyprus Women's Cup, in a 3–2 defeat by Russia.

International goals
Scores and results list Scotland's goal tally first.

References

External links

1986 births
Living people
Scottish women's footballers
Scotland women's international footballers
Rangers W.F.C. players
Hibernian W.F.C. players
Motherwell L.F.C. players
Women's association football midfielders
Hamilton Academical W.F.C. players